Ava Michelle Knight-Salicka (born ) is an American professional boxer. She held the IBF female flyweight title from 2011 to 2012 and has challenged for world titles in three weight divisions; the WBC female super flyweight title in 2009; the WBO female bantamweight title in 2011; and the WBC female light flyweight title in 2013. As of September 2020, she is ranked as the world's fourth best active female flyweight by The Ring and eighth by BoxRec.

Boxing career
Knight has won the WBC diamond belt international boxing title.

Mixed martial arts career
Knight made her MMA debut against Shannon Goughary at Bellator 228 on September 28, 2019. She won the fight by TKO in the third round.

Knight faced Emilee King at Bellator 238 on January 25, 2020. She lost the bout via first round submission.

Professional boxing record

Mixed martial arts record

|-
|Loss
|align=center|1–1
|Emilee King
|Submission (rear-naked choke)
|Bellator 238
|
|align=center|1
|align=center|2:18
|Inglewood, California, United States
|
|-
|Win
|align=center|1–0
|Shannon Goughary
|TKO (punch to the body)
|Bellator 228
|
|align=center|3
|align=center|1:46
|Inglewood, California, United States
|

References

External links
 

1988 births
Sportspeople from Chico, California
Living people
American women boxers
World flyweight boxing champions
World boxing champions
American female mixed martial artists
American people of Polish descent
Boxers from California
Mixed martial artists from California
Mixed martial artists utilizing boxing
21st-century American women